James Abram Kase (May 18, 1888 – ) was an American basketball coach.  Born in Columbia County, Pennsylvania, he was a graduate of the Danville (Penn.) Chautauqa College of Physical Training.  He became the head coach for the Indiana Hoosiers men's basketball team for the 1911–12 season, compiling a record of 6–11. He later served as the physical director at Indiana University.  In 1942, he was living in Danville, Pennsylvania, and was employed as a salesman in 40 Pennsylvania counties for the Dr. L. D. Le Gear Medicine Co.

References

1888 births
Year of death missing
Basketball coaches from Pennsylvania
Indiana Hoosiers men's basketball coaches
People from Columbia County, Pennsylvania
People from Danville, Pennsylvania